Calne Without is a civil parish in Wiltshire, England. It is a rural parish surrounding the town of Calne, extending west to the Avon and south to the Roman road from London to Bath. Settlements in the parish are the village of Derry Hill; the small villages of Calstone Wellington, Sandy Lane, Stockley and Studley; the dispersed settlement of Stock; the hamlets of Blackland, Broad's Green, Buck Hill, Mile Elm, Pewsham and Theobald's Green; and part of the hamlet of Ratford. The parish also encompasses the former tithing of Calstone, and the country house estates of Bowood and Whetham.

The parish was created in 1890 when the large Calne parish was divided. The municipal area became Calne Within parish and the remainder formed Calne Without, together with the land of the abolished Blackland and Calstone Wellington parishes and the liberty of Bowood, and a small area of Bremhill parish. In 1934, Calne Without was reduced in size by transferring to Calne Within an area with a population of around 900, and transferring a smaller area to Cherhill. Finally, when Pewsham parish (to the west) was abolished in 1984 its rural area was transferred to Calne Without.

The River Marden flows through the parish from its source near Calstone Wellington.

Proposed abolition 
A Community Governance Review begun in 2021 may result in abolition of the parish. Its western area would form a new parish of Derry Hill & Studley (to include Pewsham and Sandy Lane), while other parts would be transferred to Bremhill, Heddington and Cherhill parishes. , the recommendations have draft status.

References

External links
 

 
Civil parishes in Wiltshire